Samuel Molina Vivar (born 29 November 1998) is a Spanish professional boxer who has held the IBO IberoAmerican lightweight title since 2019. As an amateur he competed at the 2017 European U-22 Championships.

Professional boxing record

References

External links

Spanish boxers
1998 births
Living people
Lightweight boxers
Sportspeople from Málaga